Lagunov, fem. Lagunova  is a Russian-language surname. Notable people with this surname include:

Yevgeny Lagunov Russian swimmer 
Dmitri Lagunov (1888-1942) Russian footballer 
Maria Lagunova, World War II Soviet woman tank driver

See also
Logunov

Russian-language surnames